Moorcroft is a surname. Notable people with the surname include:

David Moorcroft, English former 1500m and 5000m runner and chairman of UK Athletics
Gary Moorcroft, Australian rules footballer
Judy Moorcroft (1933-1991), costume designer
Nick Moorcroft, English screenwriter
William Moorcroft (explorer), English explorer
William Moorcroft (potter), potter who founded the Moorcroft pottery